Charles Marquise Godfrey (born November 15, 1985) is a former American football free safety. He played college football at Iowa and was drafted by the Carolina Panthers in the third round of the 2008 NFL Draft.

College career
At the University of Iowa Godfrey appeared in 47 contest with 28 starts, 25 coming at corner back 2 at strong safety and 1 at free safety. During his career he recorded 193 tackles and seven interceptions. In his junior season, he recorded 83 tackles and two interceptions. As a senior, he recorded 65 tackles and five interceptions.

Professional career

2008 NFL Draft

Despite spending most of his time at cornerback, he was described as a physical hitter that likes to provide run support, and may be better suited at safety.

Carolina Panthers
Godfrey was selected with the 4th pick in the 3rd round of the 2008 NFL Draft. The Panthers previously acquired the pick from the New York Jets along with a 5th round pick that was used to select Gary Barnidge in a trade that sent Kris Jenkins to the Jets. He was quickly announced the team's free safety during camp that May, after reportedly impressing coaches. He started all 16 games at the free safety position and finished his rookie campaign with 61 tackles, 1 sack, 1 forced fumble and 1 interception.

On September 10, 2011, the Panthers re-signed Godfrey to a 5-year/$27.5 million contract extension with $12.4 million guaranteed.

On October 26, 2012, Godfrey was fined $7,875 for a chop block in Week 7 against the Dallas Cowboys.

It was announced during the offseason before the 2014 NFL season that Godfrey would be moved from safety to nickelback. He was released on October 21, 2014.

Atlanta Falcons
On October 28, 2014, Godfrey was signed by the Atlanta Falcons.

He was released on September 15, 2015, in order to make room for the signing of Jake Long. On October 6, Godfrey re-signed with the Falcons to offer depth while starting safety Ricardo Allen recovers from injuries.

On October 20, 2015, it was reported that the Falcons had released Godfrey in order to make room for newly acquired linebacker, Philip Wheeler. On October 27, 2015, the Falcons re-signed Godfrey.

Godfrey signed another contract to stay with the Falcons on March 15, 2016, but decided to retire and was placed on the team's reserve/retired list. He was released from the list on July 26, 2020.

Career statistics

References

External links
Carolina Panthers bio
Iowa Hawkeyes bio

1985 births
Living people
American football cornerbacks
American football safeties
Atlanta Falcons players
Carolina Panthers players
Iowa Hawkeyes football players
Players of American football from Houston